Robert or Bob Hoffman may refer to:

 Robert A. Hoffmann, retired United States Air Force Brigadier General 
 Robert Hoffman (actor) (born 1980), American actor
 Bob Hoffman (basketball) (born 1957), American basketball coach
 Robert Hoffman (businessman) (1947–2006), American businessman
 Bob Hoffman (American football) (1917–2005), American football player
 Bob Hoffman (sports promoter) (1898–1985), American promoter and entrepreneur of physical culture
 Bobby Hoffman (born 1966), martial arts fighter
 Robert Hoffman (Jericho)

See also
 Robert Hoffmann (1939–2022), Austrian actor and model